Polskie Radio Program I, known also as PR1 or radiowa Jedynka is a radio channel broadcast by the Polish public broadcaster, Polskie Radio. It is dedicated to information and easy listening music. Program I began test transmissions on 1 February 1925, and began regular transmissions on 18 April 1926 (as Polskie Radio Warszawa), one year after Polskie Radio was founded.

Some of its broadcasts have decades-old traditions and are quite famous, such as Matysiakowie, W Jezioranach.

See also
Eastern Bloc information dissemination

References

External links
Polskie Radio Program I - official website 

Polskie Radio
1926 establishments in Poland
Radio stations established in 1926